Arterial calcification due to CD73 deficiency or Calcification of joints and arteries is a rare genetic disorder affecting adults.

Presentation

This condition is characterised by calcification of the peripheral arteries. The lower limbs are more commonly affected than the upper limbs. This may be clinically silent but may also present with ischemia of the affected limb(s).

Genetics

This condition is caused by mutations in the 5'-Nucleotidase Ecto (NT5E) gene. This gene is found on the long arm of chromosome 6 (6q14.3). The protein hydrolyies extracellular adenosine monophosphate. It is found on the cell surface of many cell types. The protein is also known as CD73. It acts as a homodimer and functions in conjunction with in concert with ectonucleoside triphosphate diphosphohydrolase-1 (ENTPD1) also known as CD39.This condition is inherited in an autosomal recessive fashion.

Diagnosis
Medical evaluation and genetic test are used to ascertain Arterial calcification due to CD73 deficiency

Incidence

This a rare disorder, up to 2020 less than 20 individuals have been reported to have the condition

History

This condition was first described in 2011.

References

Rare syndromes
Congenital disorders
Rare diseases
Autosomal recessive disorders